The Swinton and Knottingley Joint Railway was a British railway company formed to connect the Midland and Great Central lines at Swinton, north of Rotherham, with the North Eastern Railway at Ferrybridge, near Knottingley, a distance of , opening up a more direct route between York and the Sheffield area.

History
The line between Swinton and Ferrybridge was jointly owned by the North Eastern and Midland Railways and later was jointly worked by their successors the London and North Eastern Railway and the London Midland and Scottish Railway.

The line was opened on 1 May 1879, with stations at Ferrybridge (1882), Pontefract Baghill, Ackworth (1 July 1879), Moorthorpe, Frickley and Bolton-on-Dearne (1 July 1879).

The route is now the central section of the Dearne Valley Line between York and Sheffield and is operated by Northern. The section from Swinton to Moorthorpe is part of the line from Sheffield to Leeds, known as the Wakefield Line, since the closure of the North Midland route via  due to mining subsidence in 1985.

References

Pre-grouping British railway companies
British joint railway companies
Swinton, South Yorkshire
Railway lines opened in 1879